Stains on a Decade is the fifth compilation album by English alternative rock band Felt, released in 2003. A career-spanning collection, it contains tracks from the band's singles released between 1981 and 1988, with one album-track exception: "Dismantled King Is Off The Throne".

"Sunlight Bathed the Golden Glow" as it appears here is the original single, and is different from the version on the band's third album. The version of "Fortune" here is a re-recording of the song from their first album.

Track listing

Personnel
Felt
Gary Ainge
Lawrence
Marco Thomas
Martin Duffy
Maurice Deebank
Mick Lloyd
Nick Gilbert

With Help From
Elizabeth Fraser
Frank Sweeney
John Rivers
Neil Scott
Richard Thomas
Rose McDowall
Tony Race

References 

Felt (band) albums
Cherry Red Records compilation albums
2003 compilation albums